Marian Anghelina (born 2 May 1991) is a Romanian professional footballer who plays as a midfielder.

Honours

ALRO Slatina
Liga III: 2009–10

CS Afumați
Liga III: 2015–16

SCM Pitești
Liga III: 2016–17

FC U Craiova 1948
Liga II: 2020–21

References

External links
 
 

1991 births
Living people
People from Olt County
Romanian footballers
Association football defenders
Liga I players
Liga II players
Liga III players
FC Dinamo București players
FC Botoșani players
CS Afumați players
FC Argeș Pitești players
ACS Viitorul Târgu Jiu players
AFC Dacia Unirea Brăila players
FC Ripensia Timișoara players
CS Mioveni players
FC U Craiova 1948 players
CS Concordia Chiajna players